Xavier "Xavi" Pons Foncillas (born 14 November 2000) is a Spanish professional footballer who plays as a midfielder for UD Socuéllamos.

Club career
Born in Les Masies de Voltregà, Barcelona, Catalonia, Pons represented Club Gimnàstic Manresa, CF Damm and Lorca FC as a youth. In March 2019, he moved to Primera Catalana side UE Vic, and made his senior debut on 28 April by playing the entire second half in a 1–1 home draw against Sant Cugat FC.

On 16 January 2020, Pons joined Tercera División side Águilas FC. In the middle of that year, he moved to fellow fourth tier side CD Madridejos.

On 2 July 2021, Pons signed for FC Cartagena and was initially assigned to the reserves in the Tercera División RFEF. He made his first team debut on 30 November, coming on as a late substitute for Neskes in a 2–0 away win over Racing Rioja CF in the season's Copa del Rey.

Pons made his professional debut on 2 January 2022, replacing Mo Dauda in a 1–0 away success over UD Almería in the Segunda División. On 25 June, he signed for Segunda Federación side UD Socuéllamos.

References

External links

2000 births
Living people
People from Osona
Sportspeople from the Province of Barcelona
Footballers from Catalonia
Spanish footballers
Association football midfielders
Segunda División players
Segunda Federación players
Tercera División players
Tercera Federación players
Primera Catalana players
Águilas FC players
FC Cartagena B players
FC Cartagena footballers
UD Socuéllamos players